During the 2002–03 German football season, 1. FC Kaiserslautern competed in the Bundesliga.

Season summary
With Kaiserslautern in the relegation zone and eliminated from the Intertoto Cup, manager Andreas Brehme was sacked. After a brief caretaker spell under his assistant manager, Karl-Heinz Emig, former PSV Eindhoven manager Eric Gerets was recruited. Although the defense was improved, conceding only 3 goals more all season than in the championship season of 1998, the attacking record suffered and Kaiserslautern finished 14th, 4 points ahead of the relegation zone. However, the team did make a run to the final of the DFB-Pokal; despite a 3–1 defeat to double winners Bayern Munich, the team qualified again for the UEFA Cup.

Players

First-team squad
Squad at end of season

Left club during season

Competitions

Bundesliga

League table

Notes

References

1. FC Kaiserslautern seasons
German football clubs 2002–03 season